The 2018–19 Macedonian First League was the 27th season of the Macedonian First Football League, the highest football league of North Macedonia (before 12 February Macedonia). It began on 11 August 2018 and ended on 26 May 2019. Each team played the other sides four times on home-away basis, for a total of 36 matches. Shkëndija were the defending champions, having won their second title in 2017–18.

Promotion and relegation

Participating teams

Personnel and kits

Note: Flags indicate national team as has been defined under FIFA eligibility rules. Players may hold more than one non-FIFA nationality.

League table

Results
Each team played home-and-away against every other team in the league twice, for a total of 36 matches each.

Matches 1–18

Matches 19–36

Positions by round
The table lists the positions of teams after each week of matches. In order to preserve chronological evolvements, any postponed matches are not included to the round at which they were originally scheduled, but added to the full round they were played immediately afterwards.

Season statistics

Top scorers

See also
2018–19 Macedonian Football Cup
2018–19 Macedonian Second Football League
2018–19 Macedonian Third Football League

References

External links
Football Federation of Macedonia 
MacedonianFootball.com 

North Macedonia
1
2018-19